Meri Saas Bhoot Hai is an Indian Hindi-language horror-comedy television series.  Produced by Film Farm India and an official remake of Star Jalsha's Bengali series Chuni Panna, it starred  Sushmita Mukherjee, Kajal Chauhan and Vibhav Roy. It premiered on 23 January 2023 on Star Bharat.

Cast
 Sushmita Mukherjee as Rekha
 Kajal Chauhan as Gaura

 Vibhav Roy as Som

Recurring
 Kundan Kumar as Panditji
 Bhavana Balsavar as Kanchan, Jiji and Som's Bua
 Vishal Chaudhary as Rahul, Jiji's son.
 Karan Gupta as Manish and Son's Friend
 Anant Kumar as Satish Sharma

Production
Sushmita Mukherjee was cast in the titular role, of Ghost as Rekha. Kajal Chauhan was cast as Gaura opposite Mukherjee. 

Initially, Namik Paul was in talks to play male lead but couldn't join due to his prior commitments. Vibhav Roy was cast opposite Chauhan. Anushka Srivastava was cast to portray the negative lead.

The series is set against the backdrop of Varanasi. It is mainly shot at the Film City, Mumbai. It replaced RadhaKrishn  from 23 January 2023.

Adaptations
Meri Saas Bhoot Hai is an official remake of Star Jalsha's Bengali series Chuni Panna, that aired from 11 November 2019 to 11 October 2020.

See also  
 List of programs broadcast by Star Bharat

References

External links
 Meri Saas Bhoot Hai on Disney+ Hotstar
 

2023 Indian television series debuts
Hindi-language television shows
Indian television soap operas
Indian drama television series
Star Bharat original programming